Pamela Rodríguez-Arnaiz Amianto (born 12 May 1983) is a Peruvian singer, a two-time Latin Grammy nominee. Her musical approach explores diverse genres such as pop, art rock, contemporary Peruvian music, and jazz. Her songs deal with social issues, the freedom of the human being and of women, and intimate themes.

Personal life
Pamela Rodríguez was born in Lima, Peru. She is a descendant of diverse cultures: one mestizo grandfather (the son of a Spaniard and an indigenous Peruvian) with a Neapolitan grandmother, and one Italian grandfather with a Bolivian-English grandmother.

She has written poems, played the piano, and painted since she was 9 years old. She has kept records of her creations since that time.

She lived in Canada during two years of her childhood, where she sang in several local choirs.

When she returned to Lima with her family, she studied music and art. At age 14, thanks to her father (a musician and producer), she started recording in studios. Later she had private lessons in singing with Mariela Monzón and music with Pelo Madueño.

She studied music and ethnomusicology for four years at the University of North Texas. Pamela has continued to study with teachers in various subjects, and also as an autodidact.

Rodríguez is married to the Spanish economist and writer , with whom she has a daughter.

Artistic career
Perú Blue, her first album, was released in 2005, a mixture of university jazz and Peruvian music. For that record, she was nominated for the Latin Grammy in 2006, as Best New Artist.

Next she launched En la orilla with producer Greg Landau, signifying a new step in her Peruvian-contemporary exploration. The album's songs include a celebration (where a woman escapes a macho flirt), a zamacueca with rap in Quechua, and a Landó performed by Peruvian musicians along with hip hop drummer Josh Jones (who had formerly worked with Tupac Shakur).

In the second half of 2011, Pamela Rodríguez released her album Reconocer in Peru. Its music, dressed with vintage and indie pop sounds, was produced in New York by David Little and engineers Ryan West, Ryan Kelly, and Dave Kutch.

For this production she was nominated for the Latin Grammy for Best Contemporary Pop Album.

Discography
 Perú Blue (2005)
 En la orilla (2007)
 Reconocer (2011)
 Pamela Rodríguez y FFAA (2017)

Awards and nominations

References

External links
 
 

1983 births
Living people
21st-century Peruvian women singers
21st-century Peruvian singers
Peruvian folk singers
Peruvian singer-songwriters
Singers from Lima
University of North Texas College of Music alumni